Wheelbarrow Across The Sahara is a book written by Geoffrey Howard, giving the account of his journey across the Sahara Desert. The book was first published by Alan Sutton Publishing (now Sutton Publishing) and then in paperback by Grafton. His journey was covered by British and international media.

Geoffrey Howard was an Anglican clergyman who walked 1946 miles from Beni Abbes in Algeria to Kano in Nigeria, carrying his food and water in a specially built wheelbarrow, loosely based on the design of a Chinese sailing carriage. The walk took 93 days, from December 20, 1974 to March 23, 1975.

In 2017, the book was reprinted and made available in paperback from Amazon and for Kindle. The author's royalties are donated to the British charity "Water for Kids".

Geoffrey Howard went on to write:
 "Dare to Break Bread" - Eucharist in Desert and City.
 "Weep Not For Me" - Stations of the Cross in Holy Land and City.
 "Cantona - Ooh Ah" - A short surreal story involving Eric Cantona and the Pope.

References

External links 
 BBC guide to wheelbarrows, with brief mention of Geoffrey Howard

Books about the Sahara
British travel books
English non-fiction books